Yongfu County is a county under the administration of the prefecture-level city of Guilin, Guangxi, China, located  to the southwest of downtown Guilin.  The county is mostly rural and hilly, marked by the same dramatic karst topography for which Guilin is famous.

Yongfu is perhaps best known as a center of luohan guo (Siraitia grosvenorii) production, and in particular the town of Longjiang has been called "the home of Chinese luohan guo".

Other agricultural products include mangosteens, honey, wild grapes, silkworms, rice, mushrooms, chestnuts, and yellow bamboo shoots.

Climate

References

External links
www.guilinfushou.com - for more information about Yongfu County

Administrative divisions of Guilin
Counties of Guangxi